Osvaldo Luiz Pereira (born 8 November 1980), known as Luizão, is a Brazilian former professional footballer.

Club career
He made his debut in the Russian Premier League in 2003 for FC Spartak Moscow.

Honours
 Russian Cup winner: 2003.

References

External links
 Luizão at Futpedia 
 
 

1980 births
People from Bebedouro
Living people
Brazilian footballers
Club Athletico Paranaense players
Clube Atlético Juventus players
Santa Cruz Futebol Clube players
FC Spartak Moscow players
Vila Nova Futebol Clube players
Associação Desportiva São Caetano players
Clube Náutico Capibaribe players
Rio Claro Futebol Clube players
América Futebol Clube (RN) players
ABC Futebol Clube players
Russian Premier League players
Brazilian expatriate footballers
Expatriate footballers in Russia
Association football defenders
FC Khimki players
Footballers from São Paulo (state)